Allan Holland Jr. (born November 13, 1984) is an American football coach and former player. He served as the head football coach at the University of Pikeville in Pikeville, Kentucky from 2014 until the conclusion of the 2021 Spring season.

Holland initially played college football at Wake Forest University but transferred to Eastern Kentucky University, where he played quarterback from 2006 to 2008. He also played indoor football for the Eastern Kentucky Drillers of the UIFL from 2011 to 2012.

Head coaching record

References

External links
 Pikeville profile

1984 births
Living people
American football quarterbacks
Eastern Kentucky Colonels football coaches
Eastern Kentucky Colonels football players
Pikeville Bears football coaches
Wake Forest Demon Deacons football players